The Patti Smith Masters is the box set by American rock singer-songwriter Patti Smith, released June 18, 1996, on Arista Records. The box set contains 20-bit digitally remastered CD versions of the first 5 Patti Smith's albums with bonus tracks, and a 6th disc, Selected Songs.

Track listing

Disc one

Disc two

Disc three

Disc four

Disc five

Disc six (Selected Songs)

Release history

Notes

External links 
 

Patti Smith albums
1996 compilation albums
Arista Records compilation albums